The Black Entertainment, Film, Fashion, Television, Arts and Sports Awards (commonly abbreviated as BEFFTA) are an awards ceremony aimed at honouring the best entertainment, showbiz, leadership and sports personalities from the black and ethnic communities in the United Kingdom, United States, Africa, Caribbean, Canada, Asia, Australia, Europe and globally.

History
The event was founded in 2009 by United Kingdom-based philanthropist and entrepreneur Pauline Long. The aim of the awards is to recognise and celebrate the achievements within the African and Caribbean community from the world of fashion, music, film, media and TV. 

The very first ceremony took place during Black History Month on 17 October 2009 at the Hilton London Metropole.

Categories
The award has categories to accommodate all areas of the entertainment and arts industry, which include Music, Dance, Comedy, Radio, Television, Films, Models, DJs, Events, Photography, Fashion designers, Magazine and newspapers, Hair stylists, and Make-up artists. 

Categories in the Black Entertainment, Film, Fashion, Television, Arts and Sports Awards are as follows:

Entertainment Category

Music
Best Female Act
Best Male Act
Best Unsigned Act
Best Female Gospel Act
Best Male Gospel Act
Best International Gospect Act
Best International Female Act
Best International Male Act
Best UK Female African Act
Best UK Male African Act
Best Newcomer African Act
Best UK Reggae Act
Best Female International Afrobeats Act
Best Male International Afrobeats Act
Best Female International Caribbean Act
Best Male International Caribbean Act
Best Female African Legend
Best Male African Legend
Best Music Producer
Best Music Video Director
Best Music Video Producer
Best Music Video DOP
Best Music Video
Best Record Label
Best Musician
Best Songwriter

Dance
Best Dance Act
Best Dance Choreographer

Comedy
Best Male  Comedian
Best Female Comedian

Radio
Radio Station of the year
Female Radio Personality of the year
Male Radio Personality of the year

Podcast
Podcast of the year
Podcast Presenter of the year

Newspapers/Magazines/Blogs/Social Media Group
Best Community Newspaper
Magazine of the year
Journalist of the year
Blog of the year
Best Community Website
Best Social Media Community Group

Events
Best Events Promoter
Event of The Year
Best Event Planner

DJ
Female DJ of the year
Male Dj of the year
Best International DJ

Photographers
Best Events Photographer
Best Fashion Photographer

Fashion Designers
Best Male Fashion Designer
Best Female Fashion Designer

Stylists
Best Hair Stylist
Best Wardrobe Stylist

Make-up Artists
Best Make-up Artist
Best Make-up Brand

Fashion Choreographers
Best Fashion Choreographer

Models
Best male model
Best female model
Best Modelling Agency

Beauty Pageants
Best Beauty Pageant
Best Beauty Queen
Best Former Beauty Queen
Best Beauty Pageant Director

Film Category
Best director
Best Actor
Best Actress
Best Supporting Actor
Best Supporting Actress
Best African Film Director
Best African Supporting Actress
Best African Supporting Actor
Best African Actress
Best African Actor
Best International Film
Best International African Film
Best UK African Film
Best UK Film
Best UK African Rising Star
Best International African Rising Star
International Rising Star
Best Producer
Best African Producer
Best Short Film
Best screenwriter/Scriptwriter
Best theatre production
Best Cinematographer

TV Category
Best Actress
Best Actor
Best TV Station
Best TV Show
Best TV personality
Best presenter
Best Webseries
Best online TV

ART Category
Best Spoken Word Artist/Poets
Best Art Director
Best Author

BEFFTA UK Special Awards
BEFFTA YOUNG FEMALE ACHIEVER AWARD
BEFFTA YOUNG MALE ACHIEVER AWARD
BEFFTA INSPIRATION AWARD
BEFFTA FASHION ICON
BEFFTA FILM ICON
BEFFTA ENTERTAINMENT ICON
BEFFTA MEDIA ICON
BEFFTA CREATIVE ICON
BEFFTA EXCELLENCE AWARD
BEFFTA LEADERSHIP AWARD
BEFFTA HUMANITARIAN AWARD
BEFFTA BEST SPORTS PERSONALITY
BEFFTA FEMALE LIFETIME ACHIEVEMENT AWARD
BEFFTA MALE LIFETIME ACHIEVEMENT AWARD
BEFFTA FEMALE LEGEND AWARD
BEFFTA MALE LEGEND AWARD
BEFFTA BUSINESS AWARD
BEFFTA KEYWORKER AWARD
BEFFTA CHARITY AWARD
BEFFTA ACTIVIST AWARD

Voting
The nomination process is in the hands of the public, then there is a vetting and shortlisting process for finalists, before public voting commences. This helps the organisers to reach the most relevant acts and be able to control the number of recipients.

References

External links

Awards established in 2009
2009 establishments in the United Kingdom